The Charli and Jack Do America Tour (also known as The America Tour) was a co-headlining tour by Charli XCX and Bleachers in support of their respective albums Sucker and Strange Desire during the summer of 2015.

As the second leg of the tour approached, Charli XCX withdrew which resulted in the cancellation of all that leg's shows. Charli XCX stated on social media that she made this decision due to "personal reasons". Although the second leg was cancelled, Shadow of The City, a new festival curated by Jack Antonoff, was still scheduled to take place.

Musicians 
Charli XCX's live band consisted of Debbie Knox-Hewson (drums), Vicky Warwick (bass) and JinJoo Lee (guitar). Bleachers included the musicians Jon Shiffman (drums), Sean Hutchinson (drums), Mikey Freedom Heart (bass), and Evan Smith (keyboards, saxophone).

Opening act
Børns
Robert DeLong

Set list

Tour dates

Cancelled shows

References

2015 concert tours
Co-headlining concert tours
Charli XCX concert tours